Ventureño is a member of the extinct Chumashan languages, a group of Native American languages previously spoken by the Chumash people along the coastal areas of Southern California from as far north as San Luis Obispo to as far south as Malibu. Ventureño was spoken from as far north as present-day Ventura to as far south as present-day Malibu and the Simi Hills, California. Dialects probably also included Castac and Alliklik.

Ventureño is, like its sister Chumashan languages, a polysynthetic language, having larger words composed of a number of morphemes. Ventureño has separate word classes of verb, noun, and oblique adjunct; with no separate word class for adjectives or adpositions. Nouns and verbs are often heavily affixed (mostly prefixed) in Ventureño, affixing being a way to denote those meanings often conveyed by separate words in more analytic languages. Verbs play a primary role in Ventureño with utterances often composed only of a verb with clitics. Chumash word order is VSO/VOS, or VS/VO.

Phonology
Ventureño has a similar phonemic inventory to other Chumash languages. Ventureño consists of 30 consonants and 6 vowels.

Vowels
In Barbareño transcriptions,  is used. It is not known whether these two phones are the same in both languages (and the difference in transcription merely one of convention), or whether the sounds were in fact different enough for Harrington to use different symbols.

Consonants

Orthography
Ventureño has been written in several different ways by different linguists. John Peabody Harrington, who compiled most of the data on Ventureño, used a modified version of the International Phonetic Alphabet.

A standard apostrophe  continues to be used for a glottal stop  and for denoting ejectives. Glottalized sonorants  are written with a combining apostrophe over the symbol.

Morphology
Chumash morphology is fairly polysynthetic. This applies especially to the verbs of the language, which has over 15 distinct morphological slots (when counting nominalized verbs).
This is illustrated in the table below by the nominalized verb meaning "your wanting to make fun of us".

Numbers 
The Chumash languages exhibit a quaternary numeral system. The numbers 1–16 exhibit certain characteristics which are different from the method of counting from 17 to 32. In all places, however, the multiple of 4 usually has a unique term. Ventureño Chumash has the most complete, native Chumash system of numbers on record.

References

External links
Ventureño language overview at the Survey of California and Other Indian Languages

OLAC resources in and about the Ventureño language
Ventureño at the California Language Archive

Chumashan languages
Indigenous languages of California
Extinct languages of North America
Languages extinct in the 20th century
History of Ventura County, California